WVHK (100.7 FM) is a contemporary hit radio formatted broadcast radio station licensed to Christiansburg, Virginia, serving the New River Valley. WVHK used to be owned and operated by Cumulus Media. On September 6, 2018, Cumulus Media announced it would sell its Blacksburg cluster to Monticello Media. The sale was approved December 1, 2018. On January 20, 2019, the station's format was switched to Contemporary Hit Radio and the branding to "Hot 100.7".

References

External links
Hot 100 Online

Contemporary hit radio stations in the United States
VHK
Radio stations established in 1992
1992 establishments in Virginia